14 Aurigae is a quadruple star system located 269 light years away from the Sun in the zodiac constellation of Auriga. It has the variable star designation KW Aurigae, whereas 14 Aurigae is the Flamsteed designation. It is visible to the naked eye as a faint, white-hued star with a combined apparent visual magnitude of 5.01. The system is moving closer to the Sun with a heliocentric radial velocity of −9 km/s.

The magnitude 5.08 primary member, designated component A, is a single-lined spectroscopic binary system in a circular orbit with a period of 3.7887 days. The visible member has a stellar classification of A9 IV or A V, depending on the source, and is a Delta Scuti variable with an amplitude of 0.08 magnitude and a period of 2.11 hours. It is 609 million years old with 1.64 times the mass of the Sun.

However, component C, an F-type main sequence star of magnitude 7.86, shares a common proper motion with component A and thus they form a system. This member is also a single-lined spectroscopic binary, having a period of 2.9934 days. If it is indeed bound to Ca, its orbital period is around 1,300 years.

References

External links
 HR 1706
 CCDM J05154+3242
 Image 14 Aurigae

A-type main-sequence stars
A-type subgiants
F-type main-sequence stars
White dwarfs
4
Delta Scuti variables
Auriga (constellation)
BD+32 0922
Aurigae, 14
033959
024504
1706
Aurigae, KW